Sunrise Manor is a census-designated place in Clark County, Nevada, United States, located on the western base of Frenchman Mountain, east of Las Vegas. The population was 205,618 at the 2020 census. If Sunrise Manor were to be incorporated, it would be one of the largest cities in Nevada. Sunrise Manor was formed in May 1957.

History
In 1957, North Las Vegas was planning for annexation of the area, and the Clark County Commission did not approve of it, and so created Sunrise Manor in May of the same year. It originally only consisted of the northern fraction of its modern-day boundary. By the time of the 1970 Census, the census-designated place of Vegas Creek was formed to the south of Sunrise Manor. It was dissolved in 1980, and added to Sunrise Manor the same year, roughly making Sunrise Manor's boundaries similar to its modern-day borders.

In 2018, some of the residents of Sunrise Manor proposed incorporation as its own city. This proposed city would include Sunrise Manor and neighboring Whitney. Residents who were for incorporation argued that Sunrise Manor does not get enough recognition being part of Clark County and that a city would need to address crime, drugs, and homelessness, while residents who were against incorporation argued that incorporation will be costly and inefficient, comparing it to North Las Vegas.

Geography

Demographics

At the census of 2010, there were 189,372 people living in the CDP. The racial makeup was 48.9% White, 12.6% African American, 0.9% Native American, 5.7% Asian, 0.6% Pacific Islander, and 5.1% from two or more races. Hispanic or Latino of any race were 48.5% of the population and 30.2% of the population was non-Hispanic White.

At the 2000 census there were 156,120 people, 53,745 households, and 38,535 families living in the CDP. The racial makeup of the CDP was 63.47% White, 12.89% African American, 0.98% Native American, 6.41% Asian, 0.46% Pacific Islander, 10.13% from other races, and 4.67% from two or more races. Hispanic or Latino of any race were 27.02%.

Of the 53,745 households 37.9% had children under the age of 18 living with them, 49.3% were married couples living together, 15.6% had a female householder with no husband present, and 28.3% were non-families. 20.3% of households were one person and 6.0% were one person aged 65 or older. The average household size was 2.88 and the average family size was 3.32.

The age distribution was 29.7% under the age of 18, 9.8% from 18 to 24, 31.3% from 25 to 44, 20.0% from 45 to 64, and 9.2% 65 or older. The median age was 32 years. For every 100 females, there were 99.4 males. For every 100 females age 18 and over, there were 97.0 males.

The median household income was $41,066 and the median family income  was $44,339. Males had a median income of $31,175 versus $24,605 for females. The per capita income for the CDP was $16,659. About 10.4% of families and 12.8% of the population were below the poverty line, including 17.0% of those under age 18 and 7.0% of those age 65 or over.

Landmarks

It is home of the Las Vegas Nevada Temple of the Church of Jesus Christ of Latter-day Saints, which was dedicated on December 16, 1989.

Sam's Town Las Vegas, a casino and entertainment venue that is part of the Boulder Strip, is located in Sunrise Manor.

East Career and Technical Academy (ECTA or East Tech), Eldorado High School, Las Vegas High School and Sunrise Mountain High School serve the Sunrise Manor area.  ECTA, a magnet school, opened for the 2008–2009 school year, admitting only freshmen and sophomores; Las Vegas High School, the oldest of the four high schools, opened in 1905; Las Vegas High School opened its new campus in 1993; and Sunrise Mountain High School was established in 2009.

See also

 List of census-designated places in Nevada

References

External links

 Sunrise Manor Town Advisory Board

 
1957 establishments in Nevada
Census-designated places in Clark County, Nevada
Las Vegas Valley
Populated places established in 1957